Royal Air Force Langford Lodge or more simply RAF Langford Lodge is a former Royal Air Force station near Belfast, Northern Ireland. Today the airfield is owned by RLC (UK) a subsidiary of RLC Engineering Group which is headquartered in the Isle of Man. Langford Lodge is located on the eastern shores of Lough Neagh and close to RAF Aldergrove/Belfast International Airport and the former RAF Nutts Corner.

The site was also known as No. 20 Satellite Landing Ground.

History
Opened in 1942 the base was an air depot for the United States Army Air Forces, as such thousands of aircraft were processed on their way to active service in Britain, North Africa, the Mediterranean and mainland Europe.

The following units were here at some point:
 No. 4 Air Navigation School RAF was formed here on 22 September 1952 but disbanded less than two months later on 15 November 1952
 No. 5 Air Navigation School RAF from 15 November 1952 until 31 January 1953 using Avro Ansons until it was disbanded
 Sub site of No. 257 Maintenance Unit RAF (March 1946 - ?)

Langford Lodge was a target in Operation Grün (Ireland), a second front to Operation Sea Lion, which was the planned Nazi invasion of Britain. German paratroopers were to capture Langford Lodge, Aldergrove and Nutts Corner while RAF Long Kesh, Lisburn was to be destroyed.

Notably, on 2 March 1989 a Dan Air BAe 748 from Newcastle, bound for Belfast International Airport, mistakenly landed at Langford Lodge.

Today
Langford Lodge is currently home to two model flying clubs; Langford Model Aviation & Langford Model Heli Club.

Some of the wartime airfield facilities used to house the Ulster Aviation Society's Heritage Centre. Exhibits included a Blackburn Buccaneer, a Hawker Sea Hawk and a Westland Wessex.  The Society has now moved out and is finding a new home for the collection.

There is a  rocket sled track owned by Martin-Baker.

See also
List of former Royal Air Force stations

References

Citations

Bibliography

External links
 Langford Model Aviation
 Langford Model Heli Club

 
Military units and formations established in 1942
Royal Air Force stations in Northern Ireland
Buildings and structures in County Antrim
Military history of County Antrim
World War II sites in Northern Ireland
Royal Air Force satellite landing grounds